General Sir Henry Augustus Smyth  (25 November 1825 – 19 September 1906) was a senior British Army officer. He was the son of Admiral William Henry Smyth and the brother of astronomer Charles Piazzi Smyth and geologist Sir Warington Wilkinson Smyth. Of his sisters, Henrietta married the theologian Baden Powell and Georgiana the anatomist Sir William Henry Flower.

Military career
Born on 25 November 1825 in Westminster and educated at Bedford School, Smyth was commissioned as second lieutenant in the Royal Artillery in 1843. He served in the Crimean War and was present at the Siege of Sevastopol. He became commandant of Woolwich garrison and military district in 1882 and General Officer Commanding the troops in South Africa in 1886. In 1888 Smyth mustered an army of 2,000 troops and left for Zululand to put down a rebellion there.

Smyth became acting Governor of Cape Colony as well as acting High Commissioner for Southern Africa in 1889. He became Governor of Malta in 1890 before retiring in 1893.

Family

On 14 April 1874 at Lillington, Warwickshire he married Helen Constance Greaves (1845–1932), daughter of John Whitehead Greaves and sister of John Ernest Greaves. They had no children. Smyth died on 18 September 1906 at Stone, Buckinghamshire, and was buried there.

Notes

References
 
Attribution

1825 births
1906 deaths
Fellows of the Royal Geographical Society
Fellows of the Society of Antiquaries of London
Royal Artillery officers
Governors and Governors-General of Malta
People educated at Bedford School
Graduates of the Royal Military Academy, Woolwich
British Army personnel of the Crimean War
British Army generals